Thomas D. Brothers is an American musicologist, and professor at Duke University.

He graduated from University of Pennsylvania, magna cum laude with B.A. in music, in 1979, from University of California, Berkeley with an M.A. in music, in 1982, and with a Ph.D. in music, in 1991.

Awards
 2015 Finalist for the Pulitzer Prize in Biography (Louis Armstrong Master of Modernism)
 Irving Lowens Book Award from Society for American Music for best book on American music (2014) (Louis Armstrong Master of Modernism)
 2009 Guggenheim Fellowship
 2003-2004 National Humanities Center Fellow
 2001-2002 John Hope Franklin Institute Fellow, Duke University
 1999-2000 Harvard Fellow at Villa I Tatti, Research Center for Renaissance Studies in Florence Italy

Works
 Chromatic Beauty in the Late Medieval Chanson: An Interpretation of Manuscript Accidentals Cambridge University Press, 1997, 
 Louis Armstrong In His Own Words, Oxford University Press, 2001, 
 Louis Armstrong's New Orleans, W. W. Norton & Company, 2007, 
 Artists, Writers, and Musicians: An Encyclopedia of People Who Changed the World, Editors Michel-André Bossy, Thomas Brothers, John C. McEnroe, Greenwood Publishing Group, 2001, 
 Louis Armstrong, Master of Modernism, W. W. Norton & Company, 2014, 
 Help!: The Beatles, Duke Ellington and the Magic of Collaboration, W. W. Norton and Company, 2018, .

References

External links
 Thomas Brothers - W. W. Norton (publisher website)

 https://sites.duke.edu/thomasbrothers

American musicologists
Duke University faculty
University of Pennsylvania alumni
UC Berkeley College of Letters and Science alumni
Year of birth missing (living people)
Living people